Francis or Frank Scully is the name of:

 Francis Scully (politician) (1820–1864), Irish politician, Member of Parliament, 1847–1857
 Francis Scully (sailor) (1925–1998), American yachtsman and Olympic medallist
 Francis Scully, fictional Liverpool youth, title character of Scully
 Frank Scully (1892–1964), American journalist and author
 Frank Scully (politician) (1920–2015), Australian politician, Member of the Victorian Legislative Assembly, 1949–1958
 Frank Scully (footballer) (1899–1980), Australian rules footballer